Blacke's Magic is an American crime drama television series that aired for 13 episodes on NBC, from January 5 to May 7, 1986. Reruns later aired during the fall of 1988, to fill scheduling gaps caused by the 1988 Writers Guild of America strike.

Plot
Hal Linden stars as magician Alexander Blacke who, with some help from his con-man father Leonard (Harry Morgan), solves mysteries that get in the way of his performances. The series aired for a total of thirteen episodes and featured crimes that tested logic against seemingly magical crimes. The stories were not so much whodunits as "how-he-do-its," for Alex Blacke often had to turn detective to solve the mysteries.

Cast

Main
 Hal Linden as Alexander Blacke
 Harry Morgan as Leonard Blacke

Recurring
 R.J. Adams as Art Baer
 Claudia Christian as Laurie Blacke
 Pippin Ingalls as Jill
 Mark Shera as Lt. Ted Byrnes

Episodes

Reception

Awards
 Primetime Emmy Awards 1986 - Nominated - Outstanding Cinematography for a Series -Terry K. Meade - For episode "Prisoner of Paradise".
 Edgar Allan Poe Awards 1987 - Nominated - Best Television Episode - Lee Sheldon (writer) - For episode "Wax Poetic".

External links

1986 American television series debuts
1986 American television series endings
1980s American mystery television series
1980s American crime drama television series
English-language television shows
Fictional stage magicians
NBC original programming
Television series by Universal Television
Television shows set in Florida
Television series created by Richard Levinson
Television series created by William Link